The 2020–21 Detroit Pistons season was the 80th season of the franchise, the 73rd in the National Basketball Association (NBA), and the fourth in Midtown Detroit. This was the third season under head coach Dwane Casey. On June 18, 2020, the Pistons hired Troy Weaver as their new general manager.
The Pistons finished with the worst record in the Eastern Conference, missing the playoffs for a second consecutive season.

Draft picks

The Pistons held one first-round pick entering the draft. They acquired the draft rights to the 16th overall pick from the Houston Rockets, the 19th overall pick from the Brooklyn Nets, and the 38th overall pick from the Utah Jazz.

Roster

Standings

Division

Conference

Notes
 z – Clinched home court advantage for the entire playoffs
 c – Clinched home court advantage for the conference playoffs
 y – Clinched division title
 x – Clinched playoff spot
 * – Division leader

Game log

Preseason 

|-style="background:#fcc;"
| 1
| December 11
| New York
| 
| Bey & Mykhailiuk (14)
| Blake Griffin (7)
| Blake Griffin (5)
| Little Caesars Arena
| 0–1
|-style="background:#cfc;"
| 2
| December 13
| New York
| 
| Sekou Doumbouya (23)
| Griffin & Okafor (6)
| Derrick Rose (8)
| Little Caesars Arena
| 1–1
|-style="background:#cfc;"
| 3
| December 17
| @ Washington
| 
| Josh Jackson (17)
| Josh Jackson (7)
| Derrick Rose (6)
| Capital One Arena
| 2–1
|-style="background:#fcc;"
| 4
| December 19
| @ Washington
| 
| Grant & Rose (14)
| Jerami Grant (9)
| Blake Griffin (3)
| Capital One Arena
| 2–2

Regular season

|-style="background:#fcc;"
| 1
| December 23
| @ Minnesota
| 
| Josh Jackson (19)
| Sekou Doumbouya (9)
| Plumlee & Rose (6)
| Target Center0
| 0–1
|-style="background:#fcc;"
| 2
| December 26
| Cleveland
| 
| Jerami Grant (28)
| Jerami Grant (10)
| Mason Plumlee (5)
| Little Caesars Arena0
| 0–2
|-style="background:#fcc;"
| 3
| December 28
| @ Atlanta
| 
| Grant & Jackson (27)
| Mason Plumlee (12)
| Killian Hayes (8)
| State Farm Arena0
| 0–3
|-style="background:#fcc;"
| 4
| December 29
| Golden State
| 
| Jerami Grant (27)
| Mason Plumlee (10)
| Derrick Rose (7)
| Little Caesars Arena0
| 0–4
|- 

|- style="background:#cfc;"
| 5
| January 1
| Boston
| 
| Jerami Grant (24)
| Mason Plumlee (17)
| Killian Hayes (6)
| Little Caesars Arena0
| 1–4
|-style="background:#fcc;"
| 6
| January 3
| Boston
| 
| Jerami Grant (22)
| Mason Plumlee (8)
| Derrick Rose (8)
| Little Caesars Arena0
| 1–5
|-style="background:#fcc;"
| 7
| January 4
| @ Milwaukee
| 
| Jerami Grant (24)
| Mason Plumlee (8)
| Mason Plumlee (6)
| Fiserv Forum0
| 1–6
|-style="background:#fcc;"
| 8
| January 6
| @ Milwaukee
| 
| Jerami Grant (31)
| Saddiq Bey (10)
| Blake Griffin (5)
| Fiserv Forum0
| 1–7
|- style="background:#cfc;"
| 9
| January 8
| Phoenix
| 
| Jerami Grant (31)
| Saddiq Bey (12)
| Delon Wright (6)
| Little Caesars Arena0
| 2–7
|-style="background:#fcc;"
| 10
| January 10
| Utah
| 
| Jerami Grant (28)
| Mason Plumlee (8)
| Blake Griffin (5)
| Little Caesars Arena0
| 2–8
|-style="background:#fcc;"
| 11
| January 13
| Milwaukee
| 
| Jerami Grant (22)
| Mason Plumlee (13)
| Delon Wright (7)
| Little Caesars Arena0
| 2–9
|- style="background:#bbb"
| —
| January 15
| Washington
| colspan="6" | Postponed due to COVID-19 (makeup date: April 1)
|- style="background:#cfc;"
| 12
| January 16
| @ Miami
| 
| Jerami Grant (24)
| Isaiah Stewart (11)
| Delon Wright (10)
| American Airlines Arena0
| 3–9
|-style="background:#fcc;"
| 13
| January 18
| @ Miami
| 
| Jerami Grant (27)
| Mason Plumlee (7)
| Jerami Grant (6)
| American Airlines Arena0
| 3–10
|-style="background:#fcc;"
| 14
| January 20
| @ Atlanta
| 
| Jerami Grant (32)
| Mason Plumlee (9)
| Jerami Grant (5)
| State Farm Arena0
| 3–11
|-style="background:#fcc;"
| 15
| January 22
| Houston
| 
| Jerami Grant (21)
| Griffin & Stewart (10) 
| Mason Plumlee (4)
| Little Caesars Arena0
| 3–12
|-style="background:#fcc;"
| 16
| January 23
| Philadelphia
| 
| Wayne Ellington (17)
| Jerami Grant (9)
| Delon Wright (6)
| Little Caesars Arena0
| 3–13
|-style="background:#cfc;"
| 17
| January 25
| Philadelphia
| 
| Delon Wright (28)
| Mason Plumlee (10)
| Delon Wright (9)
| Little Caesars Arena0
| 4–13
|-style="background:#fcc;"
| 18
| January 27
| @ Cleveland
| 
| Jerami Grant (26)
| Mason Plumlee (12)
| Delon Wright (7)
| Rocket Mortgage FieldHouse1,944
| 4–14
|-style="background:#cfc;"
| 19
| January 28
| L. A. Lakers
| 
| Blake Griffin (23)
| Mason Plumlee (10)
| Grant, Griffin & Wright (6)
| Little Caesars Arena0
| 5–14
|-style="background:#fcc;"
| 20
| January 30
| @ Golden State
| 
| Jerami Grant (18)
| Jackson & Wright (6)
| Delon Wright (4)
| Chase Center0
| 5–15

|- style="background:#bbb"
| —
| February 1
| @ Denver
| colspan="6" | Postponed due to COVID-19 (makeup date: April 6)
|-style="background:#fcc;"
| 21
| February 2
| @ Utah
| 
| Jerami Grant (27)
| Mason Plumlee (14)
| Jerami Grant (4)
| Vivint Arena3,902
| 5–16
|-style="background:#fcc;"
| 22
| February 5
| @ Phoenix
| 
| Jerami Grant (21)
| Isaiah Stewart (10)
| Delon Wright (6)
| Phoenix Suns Arena0
| 5–17
|-style="background:#fcc;"
| 23
| February 6
| @ L. A. Lakers
| 
| Jerami Grant (32)
| Mason Plumlee (8)
| Delon Wright (10)
| Staples Center0
| 5–18
|- style="background:#cfc;"
| 24
| February 9
| Brooklyn
| 
| Jerami Grant (32)
| Mason Plumlee (12)
| Delon Wright (9)
| Little Caesars Arena0
| 6–18
|-style="background:#fcc;"
| 25
| February 11
| Indiana
| 
| Josh Jackson (18)
| Josh Jackson (8)
| Blake Griffin (6)
| Little Caesars Arena0
| 6–19
|- style="background:#cfc;"
| 26
| February 12
| @ Boston
| 
| Saddiq Bey (30)
| Saddiq Bey (12)
| Delon Wright (7)
| TD Garden0
| 7–19
|- style="background:#cfc;"
| 27
| February 14
| New Orleans
| 
| Josh Jackson (21)
| Mason Plumlee (10)
| Mason Plumlee (10)
| Little Caesars Arena0
| 8–19
|- style="background:#bbb"
| — 
| February 16
| San Antonio
| colspan="6" | Postponed due to COVID-19 (makeup date: March 15)
|- style="background:#bbb"
| — 
| February 17
| @ Dallas
| colspan="6" | Postponed due to winter storm (makeup date: April 21)
|-style="background:#fcc;"
| 28
| February 17
| @ Chicago
| 
| Jerami Grant (43)
| Mason Plumlee (8)
| Delon Wright (4)
| United Center0
| 8–20
|-style="background:#fcc;"
| 29
| February 19
| @ Memphis
| 
| Grant & Wright (16)
| Mason Plumlee (15)
| Mason Plumlee (6)
| FedExForum1,795
| 8–21
|-style="background:#fcc;"
| 30
| February 21
| @ Orlando
| 
| Jerami Grant (24)
| Josh Jackson (10)
| Saben Lee (5)
| Amway Center4,002
| 8–22
|- style="background:#cfc;"
| 31
| February 23
| @ Orlando
| 
| Saben Lee (21)
| Mason Plumlee (12)
| Jerami Grant (6)
| Amway Center3,631
| 9–22
|-style="background:#fcc;"
| 32
| February 24
| @ New Orleans
| 
| Josh Jackson (25)
| Isaiah Stewart (10)
| Plumlee & Smith Jr. (7)
| Smoothie King Center2,700
| 9–23
|-style="background:#fcc;"
| 33
| February 26
| Sacramento
| 
| Jerami Grant (30)
| Isaiah Stewart (11)
| Plumlee & Smith Jr. (6)
| Little Caesars Arena0
| 9–24
|-style="background:#fcc;" 
| 34
| February 28
| New York
| 
| Jerami Grant (21)
| Isaiah Stewart (10)
| Saben Lee (4)
| Little Caesars Arena0
| 9–25

|- style="background:#bbb"
| —
| March 2
| @ Toronto
| colspan="6" | Postponed due to COVID-19 (makeup date: March 3) 
|- style="background:#cfc;"
| 35
| March 3
| @ Toronto
| 
| Wayne Ellington (25)
| Dennis Smith Jr. (12)
| Dennis Smith Jr. (11)
| Amalie Arena0
| 10–25
|-style="background:#fcc;" 
| 36
| March 4
| @ New York
| 
| Wayne Ellington (17)
| Mason Plumlee (13)
| Sviatoslav Mykhailiuk (5)
| Madison Square Garden1,981
| 10–26
|- align="center"
|colspan="9" bgcolor="#bbcaff"|All-Star Break
|-style="background:#fcc;" 
| 37
| March 11
| @ Charlotte
| 
| Jerami Grant (32)
| Grant, Plumlee & Stewart (8)
| Sviatoslav Mykhailiuk (8)
| Spectrum Center0
| 10–27
|-style="background:#fcc;" 
| 38
| March 13
| @ Brooklyn
| 
| Jerami Grant (22)
| Mason Plumlee (9)
| Mason Plumlee (6)
| Barclays Center1,364
| 10–28
|-style="background:#fcc;" 
| 39
| March 15
| San Antonio
| 
| Josh Jackson (15)
| Mason Plumlee (12)
| Delon Wright (8)
| Little Caesars Arena0
| 10–29
|- style="background:#cfc;"
| 40
| March 17
| Toronto
| 
| Saddiq Bey (28)
| Mason Plumlee (14)
| Delon Wright (8)
| Little Caesars Arena750
| 11–29
|- style="background:#cfc;"
| 41
| March 19
| @ Houston
| 
| Frank Jackson (23)
| Mason Plumlee (16)
| Delon Wright (8)
| Toyota Center3,061
| 12–29
|- style="background:#fcc;"
| 42
| March 21
| Chicago
| 
| Jerami Grant (26)
| Mason Plumlee (10)
| Dennis Smith Jr. (5)
| Little Caesars Arena750
| 12–30
|- style="background:#fcc;"
| 43
| March 24
| @ Indiana
| 
| Jerami Grant (29)
| Mason Plumlee (10)
| Jackson & Smith Jr. (5)
| Bankers Life Fieldhouse0
| 12–31
|- style="background:#fcc;"
| 44
| March 26
| Brooklyn
| 
| Jerami Grant (19)
| Mason Plumlee (10)
| Mason Plumlee (5)
| Little Caesars Arena750
| 12–32
|- style="background:#fcc;"
| 45
| March 27
| @ Washington
| 
| Wayne Ellington (15)
| Plumlee & Stewart (8)
| Cory Joseph (4)
| Capital One Arena0
| 12–33
|- style="background:#cfc;"
| 46
| March 29
| Toronto
| 
| Bey, Lee & Diallo (19)
| Hamidou Diallo (10)
| Lee & Joseph (5)
| Little Caesars Arena750
| 13–33
|- style="background:#fcc;"
| 47
| March 31
| Portland
| 
| Jerami Grant (30)
| Hamidou Diallo (7)
| Cory Joseph (9)
| Little Caesars Arena750
| 13–34

|- style="background:#cfc;"
| 48
| April 1
| Washington
| 
| Josh Jackson (31)
| Mason Plumlee (11)
| Plumlee & Joseph (7)
| Little Caesars Arena750
| 14–34
|- style="background:#fcc;"
| 49
| April 3
| New York
| 
| Jerami Grant (16)
| Mason Plumlee (10)
| Jackson, Lee & Hayes (3)
| Little Caesars Arena750
| 14–35
|- style="background:#cfc;"
| 50
| April 5
| @ Oklahoma City
| 
| Jerami Grant (21)
| Hamidou Diallo (8)
| Killian Hayes (7)
| Chesapeake Energy Arena0
| 15–35
|- style="background:#fcc;"
| 51
| April 6
| @ Denver
| 
| Jerami Grant (29)
| Isaiah Stewart (8)
| Saben Lee (7)
| Ball Arena3,556
| 15–36
|- style="background:#cfc;"
| 52
| April 8
| @ Sacramento
| 
| Cory Joseph (24)
| Isaiah Stewart (13)
| Cory Joseph (7)
| Golden 1 Center0
| 16–36
|- style="background:#fcc;"
| 53
| April 10
| @ Portland
| 
| Josh Jackson (21)
| Bey & Plumlee (6)
| Cory Joseph (8)
| Moda Center0
| 16–37
|- style="background:#fcc;"
| 54
| April 11
| @ L. A. Clippers
| 
| Josh Jackson (26)
| Isaiah Stewart (6)
| Cory Joseph (13)
| Staples Center0
| 16–38
|- style="background:#fcc;"
| 55
| April 14
| L. A. Clippers
| 
| Jerami Grant (28)
| Mason Plumlee (9)
| Killian Hayes (6)
| Little Caesars Arena750
| 16–39
|- style="background:#cfc;"
| 56
| April 16
| Oklahoma City
| 
| Josh Jackson (29)
| Isaiah Stewart (21)
| Killian Hayes (7)
| Little Caesars Arena750
| 17–39
|- style="background:#fcc;"
| 57
| April 17
| @ Washington
| 
| Stewart & Jackson (19)
| Isaiah Stewart (12)
| Grant & Lee (4)
| Capital One Arena0
| 17–40
|- style="background:#cfc;"
| 58
| April 19
| Cleveland
| 
| Bey & Jackson (20)
| Isaiah Stewart (16)
| Killian Hayes (9)
| Little Caesars Arena750
| 18–40
|- style="background:#fcc;"
| 59
| April 21
| @ Dallas
| 
| Jerami Grant (26)
| Mason Plumlee (16)
| Mason Plumlee (7)
| American Airlines Center4,043
| 18–41
|- style="background:#fcc;"
| 60
| April 22
| @ San Antonio
| 
| Josh Jackson (29)
| Isaiah Stewart (13)
| Killian Hayes (5)
| AT&T Center3,334
| 18–42
|- style="background:#fcc;"
| 61
| April 24
| @ Indiana
| 
| Jerami Grant (25)
| Mason Plumlee (21)
| Hayes & Plumlee (5)
| Bankers Life Fieldhouse0
| 18–43
|- style="background:#cfc;"
| 62
| April 26
| Atlanta
| 
| Grant & Jackson (18)
| Isaiah Stewart (11)
| Killian Hayes (5)
| Little Caesars Arena750
| 19–43
|- style="background:#fcc;"
| 63
| April 29
| Dallas
| 
| Stewart & Jackson (20)
| Stewart & Diallo (10)
| Killian Hayes (11)
| Little Caesars Arena750
| 19–44

|- style="background:#fcc;"
| 64
| May 1
| @ Charlotte
| 
| Frank Jackson (25)
| Bey, Cook & Jackson (7)
| Saben Lee (7)
| Spectrum Center3,766
| 19–45
|- style="background:#fcc;"
| 65
| May 3
| Orlando
| 
| Saddiq Bey (26)
| Saddiq Bey (9)
| Hayes & Lee (7)
| Little Caesars Arena750
| 19–46
|- style="background:#fcc;"
| 66
| May 4
| Charlotte
| 
| Hamidou Diallo (35)
| Saddiq Bey (9)
| Killian Hayes (7)
| Little Caesars Arena750
| 19–47
|- style="background:#cfc;"
| 67
| May 6
| Memphis
| 
| Joseph & Ellington (18)
| Isaiah Stewart (7)
| Cory Joseph (11)
| Little Caesars Arena750
| 20–47
|- style="background:#fcc;"
| 68
| May 8
| @ Philadelphia
| 
| Bey & Grant (14)
| Saddiq Bey (7)
| Killian Hayes (6)
| Wells Fargo Center5,119
| 20–48
|- style="background:#fcc;"
| 69
| May 9
| Chicago
| 
| Killian Hayes (21)
| Bey, Stewart & Hayes (7)
| Killian Hayes (8)
| Little Caesars Arena750
| 20–49
|- style="background:#fcc;"
| 70
| May 11
| Minnesota
| 
| Saben Lee (22)
| Doumbouya & Stewart (8)
| Killian Hayes (7)
| Little Caesars Arena750
| 20–50
|- style="background:#fcc;"
| 71
| May 14
| Denver
| 
| Hamidou Diallo (18)
| Hamidou Diallo (12)
| Jackson & Hayes (7)
| Little Caesars Arena750
| 20–51
|- style="background:#fcc;"
| 72
| May 16
| Miami
| 
| Saddiq Bey (22)
| Tyler Cook (9)
| Saben Lee (7)
| Little Caesars Arena750
| 20–52

Transactions

Overview

Trades

Free agency

Re-signed

Additions

Subtractions

Notes

References

Detroit Pistons
Detroit Pistons seasons
Detroit Pistons
Detroit Pistons